Milan Jeremić (Serbian Cyrillic: Милан Јеремић); born August 30, 1977) is a Serbian-Greek former professional basketball player. He is 2.09 m (6 ft 10  in) in height, and he played at the center position.

Professional career
After playing for Partizan Belgrade's academy, he was given Greek citizenship, under the name of Milan Sagias, and he then played for the Greek club Iraklis, from 1995 to 1998. He moved to Belgium, to play with Maes Aalst Okapi. He also played in the Italian league with Olimpia Milano (1999-00), and in Poland, with Unia Tarnów (2000–01).

He moved back to Greece, and played with AGE Halkida, and then returned to Serbia, where he played with Vojvodina, in 2002–03. He returned to Greece again, where he then played with AGE Halkida, MENT, Ionikos Lamias, and Trikala 2000.

External links
 FIBA Europe Profile
 stats @ AEK.com Profile

1977 births
Living people
Centers (basketball)
AEK B.C. players
AGEH Gymnastikos B.C. players
Greek men's basketball players
Iraklis Thessaloniki B.C. players
Ionikos Lamias B.C. players
KK Partizan players
KK Vojvodina players
MENT B.C. players
OFI Crete B.C. players
Olimpia Milano players
Trikala B.C. players
Serbian expatriate basketball people in Belgium
Serbian expatriate basketball people in Greece
Serbian expatriate basketball people in Italy
Serbian expatriate basketball people in Poland
Serbian men's basketball players